Gold Past Life is the ninth studio album by Fruit Bats, released on June 21, 2019, via Merge Records.

Reception

Gold Past Life received generally favorable reviews from critics. At Metacritic, which assigns a normalized rating out of 100 to reviews from mainstream publications, the album received an average score of 78 based on nine reviews.

Track listing

Charts

References

2019 albums
Fruit Bats (band) albums